Thomas Carl Kropp (born February 12, 1953) is an American former professional basketball player born in Grand Island, Nebraska.

A 6'3" guard from the Kearney State College, Kropp played two seasons (1975–1977) in the National Basketball Association as a member of the Washington Bullets and Chicago Bulls. He averaged 2.5 points per game.

Kropp recorded a career high on 10/30/1976 against the Milwaukee Bucks, scoring 18 points and going 7/12 from the field.

References

External links
Coaching bio

1953 births
Living people
American expatriate basketball people in Belgium
American men's basketball players
Basketball coaches from Nebraska
Basketball players from Nebraska
Chicago Bulls players
Nebraska–Kearney Lopers football players
Nebraska–Kearney Lopers men's basketball coaches
Nebraska–Kearney Lopers men's basketball players
People from Grand Island, Nebraska
Players of American football from Nebraska
Point guards
Washington Bullets draft picks
Washington Bullets players